V766 Centauri, also known as HR 5171, is a yellow hypergiant in the constellation Centaurus, either 5,000 or 12,000 light years from Earth. It is said to be either an extreme red supergiant (RSG) or recent post-red supergiant (Post-RSG) yellow hypergiant (YHG), both of which suggest it is one of the largest known stars. The star's diameter is uncertain but likely to be between 1,100 and 1,600 times that of the Sun. It was previously thought to be a contact binary, sharing a common envelope of material with a smaller yellow supergiant and secondary star, the two orbiting each other every 1,304 ± 6 days. However this has since been deemed unlikely. An optical companion, HR 5171B, may or may not be at the same distance as the yellow supergiant.

System

The HR 5171 system contains at least three stars. The primary A is an eclipsing binary (components Aa and Ab, or A and C in the Catalog of Components of Double and Multiple Stars) with two yellow stars in contact and orbiting in 1,304 days. The companion has been detected directly by optical interferometry, and is approximately one third the size of the hypergiant primary. The two stars are in the common envelope phase where material surrounding both stars rotates synchronously with the stars themselves.

Component B, located 9.4 arcseconds away from the primary, is a blue supergiant with the spectral type B0. It is a highly luminous massive star in itself but visually three magnitudes fainter than the yellow hypergiant. The projected separation between the hypergiant primary and the blue supergiant is 35,000 AU, although their actual separation could be larger.

Observational history
HR 5171 was named by inclusion in the Harvard Revised catalogue, later published as the Bright Star Catalogue. It was the 5171th entry in the catalogue, listed with a visual magnitude of 6.23 and K-type spectral type. HR 5171 was catalogued as a double star in 1927.

In 1956, HR 5171 was recorded at magnitude 6.4, spectral type G5p, and profoundly reddened. In 1966 Corben recorded it as magnitude 6.51 and spectral type G5p, and noted it as being variable. A 1969 catalogue records a visual magnitude of 5.85 and a spectral type of A7V, presumably a case of mistaken identity. In 1971, HR 5171 A was identified as a G8 hypergiant, reddened by over three magnitudes of interstellar extinction and also by half a magnitude of extinction from circumstellar material. In 1979 it was confirmed as one of the brightest known stars with an absolute visual magnitude (MV) of −9.2. The G8 spectral type was later adjusted to K0 0-Ia in the revised MK system, meeting the criteria of highly luminous supergiants.

In 1973 HR 5171 was formally recognised as variable star V766 Centauri, based on Corben's 1966 catalogue. At the time it was considered a "cool S Doradus variable", a class including stars such as Rho Cassiopeiae that are now known as the yellow hypergiants. These variables are usually classified as semi-regular (SRd) due to variations which are sometimes well-defined, at other times nearly constant, and may show unpredictable fading. A detailed study showed variability in both brightness and spectral type with possible periods developing from 430 days to 494 days. Surface temperature was calculated to vary from nearly 5,000K to below 4,000K.

In a 2014 paper, VLTI observations directly determined an unexpectedly large size for HR 5171 and revealed that it is a contact binary. A shell of material around the star has also been directly imaged. In 2016, VLTI observations showed an even larger radius and an unexpectedly cool temperature for a K0 hypergiant. Further interferometry imaged the secondary star transiting the primary.

Distance

HR 5171 appears near the centre of the HII Region Gum 48d, a ring of material ionised most likely by one or both of the visible HR 5171 stars. The stars and the nebulosity all show similar space motions that would place them in the Centaurus spiral arm about 4,000 parsecs (4 kpc) away from Earth. It is apparently part of an extensive molecular cloud complex with a distance between 3.2 kpc and 5.5 kpc from Earth. Gum 48d would require one or two O-type stars to be ionised, presumably one or both of the HR 5171 stars a few million years ago. Its age is calculated to be 3.5 million years, one of the oldest known HII regions.

Early calculations based on the assumed luminosity of HR 5171B gave a distance of 3.2 kpc and 3.2 magnitudes of interstellar extinction. Comparison of HR 5171A with similar stars in the Magellanic Clouds imply a distance of 3.7 kpc. An average distance based on all these calculations is 3.6 kpc, which is still the widely accepted distance although there are reasons to think it could be closer.

Gum 48d is also catalogued as RCW 80, although the designation RCW 80 is sometimes used for the more distant supernova remnant G309.2-00.6 which overlaps it. The open cluster NGC 5281 lies 19' from HR 5171, projected against the supernova remnant but only about 1,200 parsecs from Earth.

Spectrum
The spectrum of HR 5171 is easily separated into a luminous yellow star and a hot blue supergiant. The third component, HR 5171Ab, is not resolved and its spectral type is uncertain. Both stars show 3-4 magnitudes of reddening due to dust extinction.

The yellow star has been defined as the spectral standard for K0 0-Ia stars. It shows the general features of a late G or early K supergiant, but with a number of peculiarities. High luminosity is indicated by the strength of the 421.5 nm CN break and the existence of the infrared oxygen triplet. It also shows a large infrared excess and exceptionally strong silicate absorption, both caused by a dust shell condensed out of material ejected from the star. An unusual blue excess near 383.8 nm may be due to polycyclic aromatic hydrocarbon (PAH) luminescence. The spectrum is strongly influenced by the extended atmosphere of the star, with strong emission lines formed in the stellar wind and the continuum forming in an extended region rather than at the sharp surface of a photosphere. The star effectively has a pseudo-photosphere hiding the true surface of the star.

The blue companion has been classified as B0 Ibp, a hot supergiant of normal luminosity, with some uncertainty. The spectral peculiarity code indicates that its absorption lines are less sharp than normal for a star of its type.

Variability

HR 5171 shows erratic changes in brightness and colour. HR 5171B is apparently stable, with the changes being due to physical changes in the hypergiant star, variations in the envelope, and eclipses between the two close companions.

The primary and secondary minima have depths of 0.21 and 0.14 magnitudes respectively at visual wavelengths. The light curve shows almost continuous variation due to the contact nature of the system, but there is a distinct flat bottom to the secondary minimum where the secondary passes in front of the primary. The shape of the eclipse light curve suggests that the orbit is almost edge on to Earth, and that the secondary is slightly hotter than the primary.

The eclipses occur against a background of intrinsic variations. Statistically, the system has a mean magnitude of 6.54 and average variations of 0.23 magnitude over a period from the middle of the 20th century until 2013, but within this there are decades with relatively little variation and others which are much more active. Three deep minima have been observed, in 1975, 1993, and 2000, with the brightness dropping below 7th magnitude each time for around a year. Colour changes at these minima suggest a transfer of luminosity from the visual to the infrared, either as a result of cooling or recycling by the surrounding envelope. Following the deep minima, smaller brightness peaks are observed. Overall, the variability in brightness has been much stronger since 2000.

The variations in infrared brightness compared to visual brightness correspond quite well to the light curve, suggesting that brightness changes are related to colour or extinction changes, but there has been a secular trend in the B-V colour index. From 1942 until 1982, B-V steadily increased from around 1.8 to 2.6. Since then it has been approximately constant. This does not appear to be related to reddening as it is independent of the visual magnitude, so it suggests a change in the star itself. The most likely change is that the hypergiant has been cooling and increasing in size.

The variations are erratic, but a strong 657-day periodicity was noticed in Hipparcos photometry of HR 5171. More recent variations showed the strongest periodicity at around 3,300 days, but also showed other periods including one at 648 days. This persistent periodicity through all other variations is due to the eclipses twice every 1,304 days.

It is classified in the General Catalogue of Variable Stars as a possible S Doradus variable, as well as an eclipsing variable.

Properties

The angular diameter of HR 5171A has been published three times using measurements from the Very Large Telescope, twice with the AMBER interferometer and once with the PIONIER interferometer.

The earliest AMBER interferometry was at a range of infrared wavelengths in March 2012. The best-fit model was a sharply-defined uniform disk with a small bright spot towards its edge, all surrounded by a fainter extended envelope. The size of the smaller disk, assumed to be the secondary star, was not well-defined. The second set of AMBER observations were made in the K-band in April 2014. The PIONIER observations were made across six different infrared wavelengths during 2016 and 2017. Aperture synthesis was used to produce an image of HR 5171 at three different phases of the orbit. In two of the images, the secondary star is visible in front of the primary, and in the third it is expected to be behind the primary and was not visible. Modelled as a Rosseland stellar atmosphere surrounded by an extended uniform disk, the photosphere was found to be between 3.3 mas and 4.8 mas. The radii are statistically consistent with each other, but more representative of an extreme red supergiant rather than a yellow hypergiant. It is unclear whether this is due to binary interaction or misinterpretation of the unusual and highly reddened spectrum.

The luminosity has been calculated from spectral energy distribution (SED) fitting to be , assuming a distance of 3.7 kpc and 3.2 magnitudes of interstellar extinction. This is considerably more luminous than expected for any red supergiant and extreme even for a yellow hypergiant.

The close secondary HR 5171 Ab is a luminous yellow star with a radius about a third that of the primary star and an almost identical temperature. From the shape of the eclipse light curve, it is 12% as luminous as the primary and slightly hotter. It is much less massive, estimated at only a tenth of the mass of the primary. Its exact properties can only be predicted from models since it is barely resolved from its larger companion and its spectrum cannot be distinguished.

The hot companion HR 5171 B is a B0 supergiant, 316,000 times as luminous as the Sun according to a 1992 paper. Although it is about half the bolometric luminosity of HR 5171A, it is three magnitudes fainter as much of its radiation is in the ultraviolet.

Evolution
The evolutionary history of HR 5171A is complicated by its uncertain and unusual physical properties and binary companion. Such stars are too massive to produce type II-P supernovae at the red supergiant stage and will evolve to higher temperatures, likely producing a different type of supernova explosion. With a temperature of 5,000 K, it would be a slightly more evolved star, having left the red supergiant phase. The primary star is probably undergoing wind roche lobe overflow (WRLOF) with a portion of the material being transferred to the secondary. This is a possible evolutionary path to a stripped-envelope Wolf-Rayet binary system. The interaction between the pair should spin up the primary to synchronous rotation, which is a possible path to fast-spinning luminous blue variables or B[e] stars.

References

External links
 VLTI Revisits the Largest Yellow Hypergiant Ever Discovered www.eso.org

Centaurus (constellation)
K-type hypergiants
Centauri, V766
119796
5171
Eclipsing binaries
B-type supergiants
067261
Triple star systems
Durchmusterung objects
TIC objects